Timonin is a Russian masculine surname, its feminine counterpart is Timonina. It may refer to
Julia Timonina (born 1984), Russian model, actress, television personality and pop singer
Timur Timonin (born 1997), Russian football player

Russian-language surnames